Sirwar, also spelled as Sirawara, is a taluk (previously a town under Manvi taluk) of the Raichur district in the state Karnataka in India. Sirwar is one of the fastest-growing towns in Karnataka. It is famous for Paddy, Sona Mossurie Rice, and its litchi, which it exports in tonnes. It is the business center of almost 30 villages across the region.

Geography 
Sirwar is situated in the southern part of India and the northern part of Karnataka. Karnataka State highway 20 (also called Raichur-Bagalakote Road) passes through Sirwar and is 36 km away from the district headquarters of Raichur, approximately 500 km from Bangalore. The highway belongs to the Raichur region.

The climate of the town is hot during the months of March to mid-June and pleasant rest of the year. Pretty cool nights and mornings during December–January.

Notable villages of Sirwar Taluk:
 Madagiri
 Kallur
 Kavitala
 Attanur
 Mallata

History 
The name of the Sirwar (syn. siri-war) comes from Siri in Kannada Siri-Rich Place. The town is an economically rich place. According to some, Sirwar produces the world's best-quality rice.

Food 
The main food in the Sirwar is rice, though rotti/khadak (crispy) rotti, sajje rotti, chapathi, curries and spicy chicken dishes are also found. Crops such as paddy, corn, cotton cotton, pulses and chillies are grown.

Occupation 
Agriculture is the main occupation, this place is being compared with Punjab, for its rich and modern agriculture. Retail and finance are also major businesses.

Local festivities 
There are several festivals throughout the year:
 Yellu Amavasya - The Yellu Amavasya festival is observed by farmers and is a form of thanksgiving to Mother Earth for a good harvest. An important ceremony on Yellu Amavasya day is the spraying of sesame and jaggery in agricultural lands. There is a belief that the sesame and jaggery are food for the worms in the farmland.
 Karnataka Rajyotsava
 Basava Jayanti
 Kanaka Jayanti
 Ugadi

See also

 Raichur
 Districts of Karnataka

References

External links
 http://Raichur.nic.in/

Cities and towns in Raichur district
Taluks of Karnataka